The 1950–51 Tercera División was the 15th edition of the Spanish third tier.

Format 
100 teams in 6 geographic groups participated this season. The winners and runners up of each group progressed to the Promotion play-offs. They formed two groups of 6 clubs playing each other home and away (10 games each).  The winners and runners up of each group were promoted to the Segunda División. Tenerife, although not a Tercera División member were involved in a play-off against the 13th placed side in the South Group of the Segunda División.

League tables

Group I

Group II

Group III

Group IV

Group V

Group VI

Promotion playoff

Group I

Note: Caudal and Alavés were promoted to the Segunda División.

Group II

Note:  Atlético Baleares and Alicante CF were promoted to the Segunda División.

Relegation playoff

Group I

Group II

Group III

Group IV

Group V

Group VI

Season records
 Most wins: 23, Eibar.
 Most draws: 9, 6 teams.
 Most losses: 25, Cieza.
 Most goals for: 111, Atlético de Zamora.
 Most goals against: 113, Cieza.
 Most points: 52, Eibar.
 Fewest wins: 5, Santiago and Cieza.
 Fewest draws: 0, Manresa.
 Fewest losses: 5, Eibar.
 Fewest goals for: 28, Cieza.
 Fewest goals against: 31, Alavés.
 Fewest points: 10, Cieza.

Notes

External links
 www.rsssf.com
Research by Asociación para la Recopilación de Estadísticas del Fútbol (AREFE)

Tercera División seasons
3
Spain